Eljanov is a surname. Notable people with the surname include:

Pavel Eljanov (born 1983), Ukrainian chess grandmaster, son of Vladimir
Vladimir Eljanov (1951–2013), Ukrainian chess player and chess book publisher